The throstle frame was a spinning machine for cotton, wool, and other fibers, differing from a mule in having a continuous action, the processes of drawing, twisting, and winding being carried on simultaneously. It "derived its name from the singing or humming which it occasioned," throstle being a dialect name for the song thrush.

See also

 Cowaszee Nanabhoy Davar

Notes

Spinning
English inventions
Textile machinery